Pennagaram taluk is a taluk in the Dharmapuri district of the Indian state of Tamil Nadu. The headquarters of the taluk is the town of Pennagaram.

Demographics
According to the 2011 census, the taluk of Pennagaram had a population of 234,406 with 123,101  males and 111,305 females. There were 904 women for every 1000 men. The taluk had a literacy rate of 57.62. Child population in the age group below 6 was 13,967 Males and 12,370 Females.

References

Taluks of Dharmapuri district